Potassium tetrafluoronickelate is the inorganic compound with the formula K2NiF4. It features octahedral (high spin) Ni centers with Ni-F bond lengths of 2.006 Å. This green solid is a salt of tetrafluoronickelate. It is prepared by melting a mixture of nickel(II) fluoride, potassium fluoride, and potassium bifluoride.  The compound adopts a perovskite-like structure consisting of layers of octahedral Ni centers interconnected by doubly bridging fluoride ligands.  The layers are interconnected by potassium cations.  It is one of the principal Ruddlesden-Popper phases. Early discoveries on cuprate superconductors focused on compounds with structures closely related to K2NiF4, e.g. lanthanum cuprate and derivative lanthanum barium copper oxide.

References

Nickel compounds
Fluorides
Metal halides
Crystal structure types